Velta Ruke-Dravina (Velta Rūķe-Draviņa; 25 January 1917 – 7 May 2003) was a Latvian-born Swedish linguist and folklorist, as well as a professor in Baltic languages at Stockholm University. Ruke-Dravina's research interests included children's language, language contact, and dialectology. Her doctoral thesis was about diminutives in Latvian. She held the only professorship in Baltic languages outside the Baltics and had a leading role in developing the teaching program on the subject at Stockholm University. In 1980, she was elected as a member of the Royal Swedish Academy of Letters, History and Antiquities.

Biography
Velta Tatjana Ruke was born on 25 January 1917 in Valmiera. She grew up in Latvia, graduating from Riga Secondary School No 2, and from the Department of Baltic Philology at the Faculty of Philology and Philosophy of the University of Latvia in 1939.

From 1938 and during World War II, Ruke-Dravina pursued doctoral studies in comparative Indo-European language research, but was not allowed to complete the studies as public defense of a thesis in this subject was not allowed in the German-fortified Latvia. She worked for a while as a lecturer in phonetics and served as an assistant to the linguist Jānis Endzelīns. She was involved in a number of projects associated with land-targeting and place-name research at the Latvian language archive.

In the autumn of 1944, Ruke-Dravina and her husband, like many others, fled to Sweden. She continued her academic activities, initially at Lund University, where she taught in Baltic languages in the 1950s, and later at Stockholm University, where she earned a licentiate degree in Slavic languages in 1954, and defended her doctorate in 1959 (Diminutive im Lettischen).

Between 1948 and 1970, Ruke-Dravina worked as a lecturer at the University of Lund, where she was an associate professor in Baltic and Slavic languages. Later, she continued her career at the University of Stockholm, first as an associate professor in Slavic languages, then as an assistant professor of general linguistics, and finally as a regular professor in Baltic languages. She became the chair of the Department of Baltic Language and Literature at the Institute of Slavs and Balts at the University of Stockholm before 1984. She was also a guest lecturer at universities in different countries. After retiring in 1983, Helge Rinholm became her successor.

From 1982 to 1990, Ruke-Dravina was an editor of the literary yearbook Zari. She published over 300 scientific articles, and was the author of several books on linguistic issues. She  received several awards and prizes for her activities.

Ruke-Dravina is the mother of astronomer Dainis Dravins. She died on 7 May 2003.

Selected works
 Latviešu valodas dialektoloģijas atlanta materialu vākšanas programa, 1954
 Laute und Nominalformen der Mundart von Stenden. 1, Einleitung, Akzent und Intonation, Lautlehre, 1955
 Verbalformen und undeklinierbare Redeteile der Mundart von Stenden : Verben, Adverbien, Präpositionen und Präfixe, Partikeln, Konjunktionen, 1958
 Diminutive im Lettischen, 1959
 Interjektionen und Onomatopöie in der Mundart von Stenden , 1962
 Zur Sprachentwicklung bei Kleinkindern. 1, Syntax : Beitrag auf der Grundlage lettischen Sprachmateriels, 1963
 Rainis kā augšzemnieku valodas pārstāvis, 1965
 Mehrsprachigkeit im Vorschulalter, 1967
 Språk i kontakt., 1969
 Initial consonant combinations in Lithuanian and Latvian , 1970
 Place names in Kauguri county, Latvia : a synchronic-structural analysis of toponyms in an ancient Indo-European and Finno-Ugric contact area., 1971
 Vārds īstā vietā : frazeologismu krājums = The right word in the right place, 1974
 The standardization process in Latvian 16. century to the present, 1977
 Jān̨i latviešu literatūrā , 1978
 No pieciem mēnešiem līdz pieciem gadiem, 1982
 Cilvēks un daba latviešu tautasdziesmās, 1986
 Rakstnieks un valoda, 1988
 Svenska ortnamn i lettisk skönlitteratur, 1989
 Valodniecība, 1991
 Jāni latviešu literatūrā, 1991
 Valodas jautājumi : rakstu krājums, 1992
 Latviešu meitene apgūst savu pirmo valodu, 1993
 Latviešu tautasdziesmu varianti : Kr. Barona "Latvju dainās", 1993
 Darbu izlase, 2017

References

Bibliography
 
 Gustavsson, Sven (2004). ”Velta Rūķe-Draviņa”. Kungl. Vitterhets historie och antikvitetsakademiens årsbok 2004: sid. [17]-24. . ISSN 0083-6796. Libris 9637340
 

1917 births
2003 deaths
Linguists from Sweden
Linguists from Latvia
Latvian emigrants to Sweden
Women linguists
People from Valmiera
University of Latvia alumni
Academic staff of Lund University
Stockholm University alumni
Academic staff of Stockholm University
Members of the Royal Swedish Academy of Letters, History and Antiquities
20th-century linguists
Linguists of Baltic languages